John Payne (born 29 September 1958 in Luton, England) is an English musician, best known as the lead singer and bassist of Asia from 1991 to 2006, then from June 2007, with Asia featuring John Payne. He also is now in Dukes of the Orient but continues to tour with The Rock Pack and also Asia Featuring John Payne.

John Payne became the frontman of Asia in 1991 at the invitation of founder member Geoff Downes, replacing vocalist/bassist John Wetton. During Payne's tenure, Asia released eight studio albums, several live albums and toured internationally. He is a founding and current member of modern progressive rock band GPS. He is also a guitarist, photographer, composer, recording engineer and record producer. Until recently, Payne was co-creator and part of the Las Vegas production Raiding the Rock Vault at the Las Vegas Hotel.

Biography
His first band were called Moonstone. They toured the UK in the late seventies, opening for well-known groups such as Argent.

In 1986, he recorded a silver selling record with the band CCCP in Scandinavia. CCCP was a group that featured John on lead vocals with Johnny Cash's stepdaughter Carlene Carter sharing vocal duties.

He provided backing vocals on several solo albums by Roger Daltrey, including Under a Raging Moon (1985) and Can't Wait to See the Movie (1987).

Back in England, he and keyboardist Andy Nye (from the Michael Schenker Group) formed The Passion, enlisting the services of drummer Clive Burr (Iron Maiden), bassist Mel Gabbitas and the ex-Mike Oldfield guitarist Ant Glynne.

Payne was considered for a position in ELO Part II on guitar and vocals. For a year prior to joining Asia in 1991, he was chosen to replace Jeff Lynne as the lead vocalist in ELO, later to be named ELO Part II, but left because of protracted negotiations over the name.

Asia
After the departure of John Wetton, Geoff Downes invited Payne to join the band as lead singer, bassist, co-writer and co-producer. Payne and Geoff Downes continued together as Asia for 15 years, with several line-ups around them, until they stuck with Guthrie Govan (guitar) and Chris Slade (drums) in 1999. This line-up persisted through 2005, when Slade departed to be replaced by Jay Schellen.

Asia featuring John Payne
In 2009, Govan was replaced by Mitch Perry and North American touring has continued through 2010. Work began on a studio album, originally called Architect of Time, but this would eventually be released under the new band name of Dukes of the Orient. A live album Extended Versions by Asia featuring John Payne, was released in fall 2007, drawn from a December 2005 live show in Sweden with Downes, Schellen, Payne and Govan.

An EP entitled Military Man was released with re-recordings of Payne-era Asia tracks: "Military Man" and "Long Way from Home", plus an Erik Norlander solo composition, "Neurosaur". Tracks were performed by Govan, Payne, Norlander and Schellen.

In 2014, a CD entitled Recollections was released, a cover album of UK progressive rock songs. As well as producer, vocalist and bassist, Payne played most of the keyboards and some guitars. He was joined by Moni Scaria, Jeff Kollman and Jay Schellen. The video for the first single "Eye in the Sky" was shot in Vegas and includes an appearance from Alan Parsons.

Dukes of the Orient
Around 2017, Payne and Norlander reunited to form the group Dukes of the Orient as a new band name for the material that had been 10 years in the making as an Asia Featuring John Payne project. Their self-titled debut was released in February 2018 via Frontier Records, featuring Scaria and Kollman on guitars from Asia Featuring John Payne, plus former members Bouillet, Govan (guitar) and Schellen (drums). The album features the former single, "Seasons Will Change," originally released by Asia Featuring John Payne in 2012. Following the death of singer John Wetton and for clarity with the Downes-led Asia, Payne and Norlander decided these recordings should be as a new band. Their second album, Freakshow, was released on 7 August 2020.

TV, film and stage
In 2007, Payne played the part of Parson Nathaniel in the touring production of Jeff Wayne's Musical Version of The War of the Worlds.  In 2016,  Payne began composition of original work for Steve Gustafson.  This work is in support to Gustafson's creation, via his Experience Based Learning zipline business, of an independent Reality TV show surrounding the zip line adventure tourism market entitled Zip Away!

The Rock Pack
In January 2014, Payne created the touring show "The Rock Pack". In this show Payne interviews iconic rock singers from major classic rock bands and performs their hits with them. It included vocalists past and present from such bands as Foreigner, Cheap Trick, Journey, Santana, Toto, Kansas and The Tubes.

Discography

Asia

Studio albums
Aqua (1992)
Aria (1994)
Arena (1996)
Archiva 1 (1996)
Archiva 2 (1996)
Rare (1999)
Aura (2000)
Silent Nation (2004)

Live albums
 Live at the Town & Country
 Live Acoustic
 Live in Philadelphia
 Live in Osaka
 Live in Köln
 America: Live in the USA

Live DVD
 "America: Live in the USA" (2003)

Asia featuring John Payne

Live albums
 Extended Versions, also released as Scandinavia (2007)

Studio albums
 Military Man (EP) (2009)
 Recollections: A Tribute to British Prog (2014)

Dukes of the Orient
Dukes of the Orient (2018)
 Freakshow (2020)

Roger Daltrey
 Under a Raging Moon (1985)
 Can't Wait to See the Movie (1987)
 Martyrs & Madmen (1997)
 Just a Boy
 Gold

Intelligent Music Project III
 Touching The Divine (2015)

Intelligent Music Project IV
 Sorcery Inside (2019)

Intelligent Music Project V
 Life Motion (2020)

Intelligent Music Project VI
 The Creation (2021)

John Payne
 "Fly Away" b/w "Coming Home" 45 RPM single, Arrival Records (1984)
 "Gonna Give Her All the Love I've Got" (1984)
 "Ride the Storm" (American Way film soundtrack, film also titled Riders of the Storm in some countries), released as a single b/w "Take the Money" (1987)
 Different Worlds cd compilation of solo work and work with ASIA and GPS, Voiceprint (2007)
 "Decoding the Lost Symbol" part of the Architects of Time project, CD EP (2009)

GPS
 Window to The Soul (2006)
 Two Seasons: Live in Japan, Volume 1 Live release (2012)
 Two Seasons: Live in Japan, Volume 2 Live release (2012)

The Passion (with Andy Nye)
 The Passion Voiceprint (2007)

Geoff Downes NDO
 Vox Humana (1993)
 World Service (1999)

CCCP
 Let's spend the Night Together (1986, reissued on cd 2007)

Lunatica
 Edge of Infinity (2006)
 Farewell My Love (2009)

Lisa LaRue
 Transformation 2012 (2009)
 World Class (2009)
 Fast and Blue (2011)

Other Collaborations
 "That's When The Crying Starts" with the band Stringer, Arrival records (1982)
 "The Secret Affair" with the band Jupiter Red (1983)
 "Baby Won't Phone" with the band Quadrascope (1983)
 Bite The Bullet with the band Bite the Bullet (1989)
 "Dark Horse" with the band That'll Be The Day (2002)
 "Killer on the Loose" with Billy Sherwood, part of the A Tribute to Thin Lizzy project (2008)
 "Beyond the Horizon" with the super-group project Roswell Six from Kevin J. Anderson and ProgRock_Records (2009)
 "Firewolfe" – Debut album (2011). Mixing and mastering.
 "The Mystic Technocracy" and "Loving the Alien" (a David Bowie cover), part of The Mystic Technocracy – Season 1: The Age of Ignorance album by Docker's Guild (2012)
 "Lucky No. 7" – album by Ted Wulfers (2012). Backing Vocals on "Jade In My Pocket" and "Stars."

References

External links
Official Asia featuring John Payne website
Dukes of the Orient official web page
Roswell Six official web page

English bass guitarists
English male guitarists
Male bass guitarists
English male singers
English rock singers
Asia (band) members
English expatriates in the United States
Living people
1958 births
People from Luton